Pascal Fugier (born 22 September 1968 in Guilherand-Granges, Ardèche, France) is a former football defender.

Honours
Montpellier
UEFA Intertoto Cup: 1999

References

External links
 
 

1968 births
Living people
People from Guilherand-Granges
French footballers
Ligue 1 players
Ligue 2 players
Olympique Lyonnais players
Olympique de Marseille players
Stade Rennais F.C. players
Montpellier HSC players
Association football defenders
Sportspeople from Ardèche
Footballers from Auvergne-Rhône-Alpes